Shining Time Station is a children's television series jointly created by British television producer Britt Allcroft and American television producer Rick Siggelkow. The series was produced by Quality Family Entertainment (the American branch of The Britt Allcroft Company), in association with Catalyst Entertainment in seasons 2 and 3, for New York City's PBS station WNET, and was originally taped in New York City during its first season and in Toronto during the rest of its run. It incorporated sequences from the British television show Thomas the Tank Engine & Friends, which was in turn based on the books of The Railway Series written by the Reverend Wilbert Awdry. The series aired on PBS from January 29, 1989, until June 11, 1993, with four hour-long "Family Specials" premiering in primetime throughout 1995. Reruns continued to air on PBS until June 11, 1998. It aired on Fox Family from 1998 to 1999. Reruns of the show aired on Nick Jr. to promote the theatrical release of Thomas and the Magic Railroad beginning June 5, 2000, and continuing until August 11 that same year, when it was replaced by Dora the Explorer beginning the following Monday. The series also aired on Canadian television networks such as APTN and SCN. Elements from the show were incorporated into the 2000 Thomas and Friends film Thomas and the Magic Railroad.

The initial 1989 season featured a cast that included Ringo Starr as Mr. Conductor, Didi Conn as Stacy Jones, Brian O'Connor as Horace Schemer, Leonard Jackson as Harry Cupper, Jason Woliner as Matt Jones and Nicole Leach as Tanya Cupper. The show was retooled for the second (1991) and third (1993) seasons, with only Conn and O'Connor reprising their prior roles. George Carlin replaced Starr as Mr. Conductor, while Erica Luttrell, Ari Magder, Danielle Marcot, and Tom Jackson joined the primary cast in newly created roles. In addition to the three main seasons, a Christmas special featuring the original cast, aired in 1990, and four "family specials" aired in 1995 featuring the second cast. Providing the musical numbers for the show was "The Jukebox Band", a group of puppets. In 1996, only Carlin appeared in a spin-off series called Mr. Conductor's Thomas Tales, which featured only six episodes with five Thomas stories and one Music video each. The station Interior was kept for the spin-off.

Background
After the success of Thomas the Tank Engine & Friends in the United Kingdom, Britt Allcroft and her production company teamed up with PBS station WNET in New York City to produce and distribute the sitcom-esque Shining Time Station, every episode of which would include a couple of episodes of Thomas the Tank Engine & Friends. The series starred Ringo Starr, George Carlin, Didi Conn, Brian O'Connor, and the Flexitoon Puppets. Ringo Starr, who had already been providing the narration for the British series, agreed to extend the role to include the on-screen character called Mr. Conductor in Shining Time Station. He left the show after its initial season to focus on his musical career and was replaced by George Carlin.

Shining Time Station received critical acclaim. In a review for Entertainment Weekly, Ken Tucker states that, compared to the faster paced Where in the World Is Carmen Sandiego?, "'Shining Time Station' wants to slow things down. It's an old-fashioned show that creates a gentle, lulling atmosphere to convince children that life is fun and that trains are the way to travel." It was a ratings success as well. In its first season, the show averaged a 0.9 Nielsen rating, translating to about 1.2 million viewers on average. At the peak of its popularity, the show brought in up to 7.5 million viewers per week.

Overview
The Shining Time Station is a train station on the Indian Valley Railroad in an unknown part of the United States. It is managed by Stacy Jones. Its workshop is run in the first season by Harry Cupper, and thereafter by Billy Twofeathers. A local named Horace Schemer, simply referred to as Schemer, runs the station's arcade and serves as the series' comic relief. He often comes up with tricks and schemes (hence his surname) to get his ways, although they usually backfire on him as a result of his foolishness. The narrative is driven by regular and incidental visitors to the station.

Mr. Conductor is a tiny man who lives in a signal house inside the station's mural and tells the stories taken from Thomas the Tank Engine & Friends to the kids. He also introduces songs to the kids in The Anything Tunnel. Sometimes, he may present a magic bubble to the kids that has the song inside as a way of introducing it. On occasion, the kids may look through a film viewer to see the song or film.

Cast

Series regulars (1989–1995)
 Didi Conn – Stacy Jones
 Brian O'Connor – Horace Schemer

Season 1 regulars (1989)
 Ringo Starr – Mr. Conductor
 Leonard Jackson – Henry "Harry" Cupper
 Jason Woliner – Matthew "Matt" Jones
 Nicole Leach – Tanya Cupper

Christmas Special characters (1990)
 Ringo Starr – Mr. Conductor
 Didi Conn – Stacy Jones
 Brian O'Connor – Horace Schemer
 Jason Woliner – Matthew "Matt" Jones
 Nicole Leach – Tanya Cupper
 Ardon Bess – Tucker Cooper (Harry's cousin)
 Lloyd Bridges – Mr. Nicholas
 Judy Marshak – Claire
 Rachel Miner – Vickie

Seasons 2 & 3 regulars (1991–1993)
 George Carlin – Mr. Conductor
 Erica Luttrell – Kara Cupper
 Ari Magder – Daniel "Dan" Jones
 Danielle Marcot – Becky (recurring in season 2)
 Tom Jackson – Billy Twofeathers

Recurring characters (full series; 1989–1995)
 Jerome Dempsey – Mayor Osgood Bob Flopdinger
 Mart Hulswit – Mr. J.B. King, Esq.
 Bobo Lewis – Midge Smoot

Recurring characters (Seasons 2 & 3; 1991–1993)
 Jason Woliner – Matthew "Matt" Jones (Season 2 only)
 Nicole Leach – Tanya Cupper (Season 2 only)
 Jonathan Shapiro – Schemee
 Gerard Parkes – Barton Winslow
 Barbara Hamilton – Ginny Johnson
 Aurelio Padrón – Felix Perez
 George Carlin – Mr. Conductor's Evil Twin

1995 Family Specials characters
 George Carlin – Mr. Conductor
 Didi Conn – Stacy Jones
 Tom Jackson – Billy Twofeathers (All but Queen for a Day)
 Erica Luttrell – Kara Cupper
 Ari Magder – Daniel "Dan" Jones (Once Upon a Time and Second Chances)
 Danielle Marcot – Becky
 Brian Edward O'Connor – Horace Schemer
 Barbara Hamilton – Ginny Johnson
 Bobo Lewis – Midge Smoot
 Jerome Dempsey – Mayor Osgood Bob Flopdinger (Once Upon a Time only)
 Mart Hulswit – Mr. J.B. King, Esq.
 Bucky Hill – Kit Twofeathers (All but Once Upon a Time)
 Jonathan Shapiro – Schemee (Second Chances and One of the Family)
 Aurelio Pardón – Felix Perez (Second Chances and Queen for a Day)
 Leonard Jackson – Henry "Harry" Cupper (One of the Family only)
 Teri Garr – Sister Conductor (One of the Family only)
 Jeannette Charles – The Queen (Queen for a Day only)

The Jukebox Band
 Steve Horelick – Composer and Music Producer
 Jonathan Freeman – Tito Swing The Piano Man
 Olga Marin – Didi The Drummer
 Wayne White – Tex The Guitarist (1989)
 Alan Semok – Tex The Guitarist (1990–1995)
 Craig Marin – Rex The Guitarist
 Peter Baird/Alan Semok/Vaneese Thomas – Grace The Bass Player (1989)
 Peter Baird/Kenny Miele – Grace The Bass Player (1990–1995)

The songs were arranged and performed by Steve Horelick with Larry Wolf. They featured vocal performances by Rory Dodd, Vaneese Thomas, Emily Bindinger and Jonathan Freemen.

Segments
The intro to each episode consists of the main theme song of the show, played to footage of the Union Pacific Steam Locomotive 844 and the credits of the series' characters. Only the first verse is sung for the beginning theme. The closing credits contain more shots of the Union Pacific 844, in addition to the full Shining Time Station theme song. For the Christmas special "'Tis A Gift" the footage used for the opening and closing sequences were filmed at the Grand Canyon Railway in Williams, Arizona and features their locomotive #18.
 Flexitoons Puppets & Marionettes – The Jukebox Band – the show's station band that performs a song inside the jukebox. They consist of pianist Tito Swing, drummer Didi, guitarists Tex and Rex (who control the guitar together), and bass guitarist Grace Bass. JJ Silvers is the manager of The Jukebox Band.
 Thomas the Tank Engine & Friends – Storytellers, Ringo Starr and George Carlin.
 The Anything Tunnel – Inside the anything tunnel, which is the tunnel on the station mural, there is a song with a cartoon, a stop motion clip, or a live action clip. Sometimes instead of the anything tunnel, Mr. Conductor would show a magic bubble or one of the kids looks through a film viewer.

Episodes

Merchandise

VHS
The beginning of each VHS release (except for Tis a Gift, Shining Time Station Singsongs, Schemer Presents: The World According to Me, The Jukebox Band: A Day in the Life, and The Jukebox Band: Lullaby) featured a model scale of a typical 1950s drive-in movie theater called the "Shining Time Drive-In Movie Theater" with parody commercials before the episode started. Then, after the episode of Shining Time Station was shown, a short segment known as "Schemer Presents!" was shown. Each segment featured Schemer teaching the viewers how to do something, with one of the other regular characters helping him. Afterwards, the announcer wishes everyone a safe drive home. The Drive-In segments were created by Chip Lord & Mickey McGowan.
 Tis a Gift
 Sweet and Sour
 Stacy Cleans Up
 Schemer Alone
 Bully for Mr. Conductor
 Becky Makes a Wish
 Billy's Party
 Schemer's Special Club
 Mr. Conductor's Evil Twin
 Shining Time Station Singsongs
 Schemer Presents: The World According to Me
 The Jukebox Band: A Day in the Life
 The Jukebox Band: Lullaby

Books
 A book, titled This Old Band, was written by Britt Allcroft and Rick Siggelkow. It featured the Juke Box Band and was published by Quality Family Entertainment in 1994.

References

External links

See also
 Thomas & Friends
 Noddy, a similar series also created by Rick Siggelkow.

1989 American television series debuts
1995 American television series endings
1980s American children's television series
1990s American children's television series
1980s American anthology television series
1990s American anthology television series
1989 Canadian television series debuts
1995 Canadian television series endings
1980s Canadian children's television series
1990s Canadian children's television series
1980s Canadian anthology television series
1990s Canadian anthology television series
1980s preschool education television series
1990s preschool education television series
American preschool education television series
American television series based on British television series
American television series with live action and animation
American television shows based on children's books
American television shows featuring puppetry
Canadian preschool education television series
Canadian television series based on British television series
Canadian television series with live action and animation
Canadian television shows based on children's books
Canadian television shows featuring puppetry
English-language television shows
Television series by WNET
Television shows filmed in New York City
Television shows filmed in Toronto
YTV (Canadian TV channel) original programming
Television series by Corus Entertainment
Television series about rail transport
PBS original programming
Thomas & Friends
Television series about size change
PBS Kids shows
Television series by Mattel Creations
Television series created by Britt Allcroft
Gullane Entertainment